Toft is a ferry port approximately one mile north of Mossbank on Mainland, Shetland, Scotland. From here, a car ferry service to Ulsta on the island of Yell operates. Toft is located in the parish of Delting.

In the late 1970s and early 1980s there was a large workers camp situated here housing thousands of men who were building the Sullom Voe Terminal.

References

External links

Canmore - Toft, Norse Mill site record
Canmore - Neshion site record

Villages in Mainland, Shetland